Carl Fodor (born November 6, 1963) is a former American football quarterback who played two seasons with the Calgary Stampeders of the Canadian Football League (CFL). He played college football at Marshall University. He was also a member of the St. Louis Cardinals of the National Football League (NFL).

College career
Fodor played for the Marshall Thundering Herd from 1983 to 1985. In 1984, he led the Thundering Herd to their first winning season since 1965. He had 39 touchdowns and 6,128 passing yards in his career. He was inducted into the Marshall University Athletics Hall of Fame in 1991.

Professional career
Fodor was signed to a one-year contract by the St. Louis Cardinals of the NFL in May 1986. He was signed by the CFL's Calgary Stampeders in April 1987. He started two games for the Stampeders in 1988.

References

External links
Just Sports Stats
Fanbase profile

Living people
1963 births
American football quarterbacks
Canadian football quarterbacks
American players of Canadian football
Marshall Thundering Herd football players
St. Louis Cardinals (football) players
Calgary Stampeders players
Players of American football from West Virginia
People from Weirton, West Virginia